A roll-away computer is an idea introduced as part of a series by Toshiba in 2000, which aimed to predict the trends in personal computing five years into the future. Since its announcement, the roll-away computer has remained a theoretical device.

A roll-away computer is a computer with a flexible polymer-based display technology, measuring 1 mm thick and weighing around 200 grams.

The first one is the Toshiba DynaSheet, named in homage to the Dynabook, an influential 1970s vision of the future of computers. The Dynasheet will feature wireless Gigabit Ethernet for LAN environments as well as 4 Mbit/s Bluetooth-V and UMTS-3 connectivity for mobile roaming in most of the countries of the world.

Flexible and rollable displays started entering the market in 2006 (see electronic paper).

The R&D department of Seiko Epson has demonstrated a flexible active-matrix LCD panel (including the pixel thin film transistors and the peripheral TFT drivers), a flexible active-matrix OLED panel, the world's first flexible 8-bit asynchronous CPU (ACT11)—which uses the world's first flexible SRAM.

University of Tokyo researchers have demonstrated flexible flash memory.

LG Corporation has demonstrated an 18-inch high-definition video display panel that can roll up into a 3 cm diameter tube.

See also 
 Tablet PC
 Roll-up keyboard

References

External links 
 http://www.toshiba-europe.com/computers/tnt/visions2000/7/
 "Foldable, Stretchable Circuits" by Kate Greene 2008

Classes of computers